Macedonian Sign Language ( or ) is the sign language of the deaf community in North Macedonia. As all sign languages, Macedonian Sign Language is based on gestures and body movements, particularly movements with the hands. The precise number of signers in North Macedonia is not known, but 6,000 people request signed news on Macedonian television. The learning and the usage of the language, as well as the rights of the deaf community in North Macedonia are regulated by a national law.

Alphabet 
The alphabet is made of 31 signs, which is equal to the 31 sounds of Macedonian. Each letter has its own sign. There are two types of the alphabet; the alphabet expressed with one hand and alphabet expressed with two hands.

Regulation 
Macedonian Sign language is regulated by a national law on 21 August 2009. Macedonian law defines it as following:

However, the law includes several things, such as: defining the language itself, the rights of the deaf people of North Macedonia, studying the language and preparing adequate interpreters, it defines the tasks of the National Association of Deaf People of North Macedonia and its financing and it secures proper implementation of the right of the deaf people. Basically, each individual is allowed to request a Sign language interpreter and the institution where such request has been made, or the individual itself, is obliged to find one.

References

External links 
 Macedonian sign alphabet on the site of NADPM.
 National association of deaf people of Macedonia
 MTV launches news for the deaf people on Macedonian.

Sign languages
Macedonian culture
Languages of North Macedonia